Larissa Anderson (née Cavanagh; born 27 March 1977) is a former Australian professional basketball player. She currently is an assistant coach for the Melbourne Boomers in the WNBL.

Career

WNBL
Anderson grew up in Victoria and played for the Nunawading Spectres before joining the Dandenong Rangers WNBL team in 1995. Anderson had a strong career through until 2008 playing for Brisbane, Bulleen & again Dandenong. After seven years away from the WNBL and coaching success in the SEABL, Anderson has returned to the WNBL and to Dandenong as the head coach of the team for the 2015–16 season. She won the WNBL Coach of the Month award twice in her first season. After spending four years in the head coach role at Dandenong, Anderson was not re-appointed when the franchise was rebranded for the 2019–20 season. 

In July 2019, Anderson joined the Melbourne Boomers as an assistant coach under Guy Molloy. Anderson was appointed to also focus on the new Boomers Academy program for up-and-coming player development.

Coaching record

WNBL 

|-  
| align="left" |Dandenong
| align="left" |2015–16
| 24 
| 15
| 9
|
| align="center" |3rd of 9
|1
|0 
|1
|
| align="center" |Lost Semi-final
|-
| align="left" |Dandenong
| align="left" |2016–17
| 24 
| 15
| 9
|
| align="center" |2nd of 8 
|5
|2
|3
|
| align="center" |Lost Grand Final
|-
| align="left" |Dandenong
| align="left" |2017–18
| 21 
| 7
| 14
|
| align="center" |7th of 8
|–
|–
|–
|–
|
|-
| align="left" |Dandenong
| align="left" |2018–19
| 21
| 9
| 12
|
| align="center" |5th of 8
|–
|–
|–
|–
|
|-class="sortbottom"
| align="left" |Career
| ||90||46||44|||| ||6||2||4||

References

1977 births
Living people
Australian women's basketball players
Australian women's basketball coaches
Basketball players from Sydney